Malcolm Douglas (8 October 1954 – 22 March 2009) was an illustrator. He died aged 54 in March 2009.

Biography
He was educated at Trinity School of John Whitgift and Sheffield University where he volunteered to illustrate a student union newspaper, the main character of which was one "Norman Density", a decision which sparked his career as an illustrator. His work could be found in many diverse publications perhaps the best known was in the comic Oink; he was also the illustrator of the character 'Fred the Red', in the Manchester United match programmes.

Bibliography
Comics work includes:

Ham Dare, Pig of the Future (with Lew Stringer, in Oink!)
The Street-Hogs! (with writer Mark Rodgers, in Oink!)

References

External links

Malcolm Douglas (J.T. Dogg) by Lew Stringer, Blimey!, June 6, 2009
Malcolm Douglas (J.T. Dogg) (1954-2009) by Steve Holland, Bear Alley, June 7, 2009

British illustrators
2009 deaths
1954 births